Laure Flament (born ) is a Belgian volleyball player. She is part of the Belgium women's national volleyball team.

She competed at the 2018 FIVB Volleyball Women's Nations League, and Belgium women's national under-18 volleyball team. 
On club level she plays for VDK Gent.

Clubs

References

External links 
 http://www.volleyball.world/en/women/teams/bel-belgium/players/laure-flament?id=64396
 http://u18.women.2015.volleyball.fivb.com/en/competition/teams/bel-belgium/players/laure-flament?id=45948
 http://volleymagazine.be/2017/05/01/laure-flament-vdk-gent-is-rookie-2017/
 https://www.cev.eu/Competition-Area/CompetitionTeamDetails.aspx?TeamID=9861&ID=839
 http://kw.knack.be/west-vlaanderen/sport/volleybal/ook-young-yellow-tigers-met-laure-flament-starten-sterk-tegen-portugal/article-normal-246679.html

1998 births
Living people
Belgian women's volleyball players
Place of birth missing (living people)
Wing spikers
21st-century Belgian women